Danger Close: The Battle of Long Tan is a 2019 Australian war film about the Battle of Long Tan during the Vietnam War. It is directed by Kriv Stenders and stars Travis Fimmel.

Plot
The film opens with a mortar attack on the 1st Australian Task Force (1 ATF) base at Nui Dat by the Viet Cong (VC) and People's Army of Vietnam (PAVN). During the attack, Major Harry Smith is cool under fire, ordering his men to take cover and stand to, while other soldiers don't take it seriously, playing cards or drinking beer. The base fends off the attack with counter-battery fire, killing the enemy mortar crew.

Instead, Bravo Company is ordered to locate the mortar firing points and the direction of the enemy withdrawal. Bravo finds no enemy forces.

The next day, Major Smith's Delta Company is sent to relieve Bravo, and thus missing the concert of Australian musicians Little Pattie and Col Joye and the Joy Boys set for that afternoon. Finding fresh tracks leading away from the mortar firing sites, Delta moves to follow the enemy forces. 11 Platoon takes the lead, and makes contact with a small VC patrol. 11 Platoon penetrates further into the plantation, widening the gap with 10 Platoon, and the rest of the company.

11 Platoon quickly comes under heavy attack, and calls down fire from artillery units back at Nui Dat, danger close to its position to hold back the enemy force. 12 Platoon reinforces, but the attack is only getting stronger. 11 Platoon become isolated, in danger of being overrun.

Back at Nui Dat, Brigadier Oliver David Jackson is hesitant to commit reinforcements, and orders Delta to withdraw. Major Smith refuses to leave 11 Platoon behind, eventually forcing Jackson to send APCs to rescue Delta, leaving the base open to attack. Low on ammunition and under a monsoon, Major Smith pleads for a helicopter resupply. The senior RAAF officer at Nui Dat, Group Captain Peter Raw, does not want to risk aircraft with a hot LZ in the monsoon. However, two RAAF Iroquois pilots, Flight Lieutenant Francis Patrick (Frank) Riley and Flight Lieutenant Robert George (Bob) Grandin, volunteer to support D Company, flying in under heavy fire.

Now resupplied, but still outnumbered, Major Smith organizes his forces to successfully hold off the assault, before the relief force of M113 armoured personnel carriers and infantry from Nui Dat finally arrives, and force the PAVN soldiers to withdraw.

Cast
 Travis Fimmel as Major Harry Smith
 Daniel Webber as Private Paul Large
 Luke Bracey as Sergeant Bob Buick
 Richard Roxburgh as Brigadier David Jackson
 Nicholas Hamilton as Private Noel Grimes
 Matt Doran as Major Noel Ford
 Lasarus Ratuere as Corporal Buddy Lea
 Stephen Peacocke as Lieutenant Adrian Roberts 
 Myles Pollard as Flight Lieutenant Frank Riley
 Uli Latukefu as Bombardier Ray Ngatai
 Anthony Hayes as Lieutenant Colonel Colin Townsend 
 Sam Parsonson as Lieutenant David Sabben
 Alexander England as Warrant Officer Class Two Jack Kirby
 Sean Lynch as Sergeant Paddy Todd
 Aaron Glenane	as Captain Morrie Stanley
 Emmy Dougall as Little Pattie
 Mojean Aria as Second Lieutenant Gordon Sharp
 Travis Jeffrey as Second Lieutenant Geoff Kendal
 Tom Yaxley as Sergeant Neil Rankin
 Sam Cotton as Corporal Phil 'Doc' Dobson
 Lincoln Lewis as Private Kevin Graham
 Ben Esler as Gunner Ken Deacon
 Jullian Cullen as Private Frank Topp

Production
Production commenced in 2018 with the script completed in June 2014. Principal photography took place between May and July 2018 at the Village Roadshow Studios in Queensland and locations around Pimpama, Kingaroy and Nerang.

Casting
On 28 February 2018, Travis Fimmel was announced as the lead actor, playing the role of Major Harry Smith. Fimmel described the role as "a big responsibility".

The initial casting call was for 30 principal cast and bit part roles, and 100–200 Australians with combat experience in Iraq and Afghanistan as extras.

Reception
The site's critics' consensus reads: "Danger Close is problematic as a history lesson, but still offers viewers an involving look at life in the trenches of a real-life conflict."

The Sydney Morning Herald wrote "Telling these stories so that we can follow the details is rare. Director Kriv Stenders has made the reality of the day accessible and gripping for a non-military audience."

Flicks Australia wrote the film was a "patriotic but problematic" Australian war film turning down the context of the war, that being an intervention by two superpowers that was veiled in imperialistic action and ignored the deeply existential crisis that existed during the conflict. The film presenting a 2019 story of "sprawling and swarming hordes of Asiatic enemies" against a morally certain ANZAC force was deeply problematic, comparing it to the propaganda-like 1968 film The Green Berets that infamously ignored the muddy ideology behind the war.

Writing for The Curb, film critic Travis Johnson noted that "Danger Close’s boots-on-the-ground approach is intentional, and its focus is deliberate though the film itself does not reflect the cultural introspection and skepticism Australians tend to give towards media depictions of war films. Reflecting on the usage of the song "I Was Only 19", the musical choice underlies "an attempt not to fall to blind patriotism" in an "unjust war". Travis Johnson comments juggling historical, dramatic, and political demands with considerable dexterity, and the result is a film whose place in the Australian pantheon is assured.".

Writing for The Hollywood Reporter, Harry Windsor described the film as "both familiar and diffuse, with thinly sketched variations on a bronzed theme rather than characters" and presenting the story with "tone-deaf triumphalism", though he noted that "digital effects are kept to a refreshing minimum".

ScreenDaily also commented that the film's "blinkered nature" in presenting a narrow tone of the film in a controversial and unpopular war was a far less welcomed feature.

Accolades

References

External links
 Official site
 
 
 Danger Close at Screen Australia

2019 films
2010s war films
War films based on actual events
Australian films based on actual events
Australian war films
Films directed by Kriv Stenders
Films set in 1966
Films with screenplays by Stuart Beattie
Vietnam War films
Films shot at Village Roadshow Studios
2010s English-language films